Projection was the ultimate goal of Western alchemy. Once the philosopher's stone or powder of projection had been created, the process of projection would be used to transmute a lesser substance into a higher form; often lead into gold.
 
Typically, the process is described as casting a small portion of the Stone into a molten base metal.

Claims and demonstrations
The seventeenth century saw an increase in tales of physical transmutation and projection. These are variously explained as examples of charlatanism, fiction, pseudo-scientific error, or missed metaphor.	The following is a typical account of the projection process described by Jan Baptista van Helmont in his De Natura Vitae Eternae.

Other reports include:	

 Elias Ashmole's Theatrum Chemicum Britannicum lists an account of Edward Kelley making projections from lesser metals into both gold and silver. Kelley's success is also recorded by John Dee.
 Alexander Seton was reported to have projected a heavy yellow powder onto a mixture of lead and sulphur resulting in a button of gold.
 A variety of accounts are given of Sendivogius performing public transmutations.
 In legend, Nicolas Flamel makes a projection of the red stone onto mercury, making gold.

While it may not account for all claims of metallic transmutation, some alchemists of this time period give accounts of fraudulent projection demonstrations, distinguishing themselves from the projectors. Maier's Examen Fucorum Pseudo-chymicorum and Khunrath's Treuhertzige Warnungs-Vermahnung list tricks used by pseudo-alchemists.  Accounts are given of double-bottomed crucibles used to conceal hidden gold during projection demonstrations.

In art and entertainment

The concept of projection appears in various fictional works related to alchemy.  It's a notable theme in Ben Jonson's The Alchemist where the following dialogue can be found, commenting on fraudulent applications of projection:

References
 Charles John Samuel Thompson. Alchemy and Alchemists. Courier Dover Publications, 2002.
 Tara E. Nummedal. Alchemy and authority in the Holy Roman Empire. University of Chicago Press, 2007.

Notes
	

Alchemical processes